Moitrelia obductella is a species of snout moth. It is found in most of Europe (except Ireland, Fennoscandia, Estonia, Latvia and Ukraine).

The wingspan is 23–26 mm. Adults are on wing from the second half of July to early August.

The larvae feed on Origanum (including Origanum vulgare), Mentha, Calamintha and Thymus species. They live in a spun terminal shoot of their host plant. They constructs a silken web intermixed with dead leaves. It overwinters in the larval stage. Pupation takes place in July within a papery cocoon in the earth or amongst leaf-litter.

References

Moths described in 1882
Phycitini
Moths of Europe
Moths of Asia